Henry Christeen Warnack (18771927)) was a film and theater critic in the United States. He released novels and works of poetry. He crafted essays on a range of topics. Besides being a talented speaker, he got involved in the early film industry, scripting stories and Scenarios for various silent films.

Early years
Warnack was born in Campbell  Tennessee,  on October 1, 1877. He attended the Military Academy -  Tennessee Military Institute. After graduation, he taught school in Maryville, Tennessee. Later, he moved to Knoxville, Tennessee. He started his newspaper career as a cub reporter for The  Knoxville Journal and Tribune and the Knoxville News Sentinel. Because of health concerns, he moved to Colorado becoming a reporter for Colorado Springs Gazette and the Rocky Mountain News in Denver.

Career
Warnack moved to Los Angeles in 1907 when he was  years of age. He worked for the Los Angeles Times as a drama critic  and became the dramatic department editor.  He also wrote stories for Fox movies. Warnack lauded the works of John Steven McGroarty.

He wrote articles for many trade journals and magazines, including: 
Out West. 
West Coast Magazine. 
Photoplay Magazine.
He also wrote "The Story of the Union Printers' Home," an essay for the 52nd convention of the International Typographical Union's pamphlet.
A writeup in Motography described his story for The Conqueror as virile and engrossing. He reviewed Eloise Bibb Thompson's first screenplay, "A Reply to the Clansman," which responded to Thomas Dixon Jr.'s novel The Clansman: A Historical Romance of the Ku Klux Klan.

According to Warnack, two of his greatest achievements were:
 The publication of the book"Life's New Psalm" in 1922
 The Honor System was a 1917  silent film about prison reforms in Arizona and directed by Raoul Walsh. Warnack's involvement in the film varies depending on the account. Some articles claim it was based on a Warnack novel, others a story he sold to Fox. Controversies aside, he was proud of his involvement.

Death
The front page November 3, 1927 article in the  Los Angeles Times reads:

Filmography
 Fires of Conscience, directed by Oscar C. Apfel
 The Honor System, directed by Raoul Walsh
 The Morals of Hilda, directed by Lloyd B. Carleton
 The Conqueror (1917), directed by Raoul Walsh
 The Eagle (1918), directed by Elmer Clifton
 Are You Legally Married? (1919)

Notes

References

Bibliography

 
 
 
 
 
 
 
 
 
 
 

Year of birth unknown
American theater critics
Los Angeles Times people
Writers from Los Angeles
American male journalists
20th-century American male writers
Journalists from California
20th-century American journalists
American film critics
American magazine journalists
American newspaper journalists